Heteropsis viettei is a butterfly in the family Nymphalidae. It is found on Madagascar. The habitat consists of forests and forest margins.

References

Elymniini
Butterflies described in 2003
Endemic fauna of Madagascar
Butterflies of Africa